Point King Lighthouse was a lighthouse located on the northern entrance to Princess Royal Harbour in Albany in the Great Southern region of Western Australia.

The lighthouse was the first navigational light for the Port of Albany and the second lighthouse to be built on the West Australian coastline.

History
Following the end of the Crimean War in 1856, a return of the profitable mail boat service from England, via Albany, to the eastern states was anticipated and the need for a lighthouse into the harbour was foreseen.

The British Government proposed to construct two lighthouses in the area in 1857, one on Breaksea Island and the other at Point King, on the understanding that the local government met the running costs. Construction commenced shortly afterward and the prefabricated lights arrived in June; the project was completed later in the year and the lighthouse commenced operating on New Years Day in 1858 with William Hill employed as the light keeper.

The light was operated manually and the keeper lived in the dwelling where the tower was housed.

The lighthouse was made redundant in June 1911. The building remained unused for many years with the roof and tower lost many years ago. In 1995 a conservation plan was prepared but by 1999 no work had been carried out.

In 2011 the Albany City Council set aside 20,000 to stabilize the ruins.

Keepers
 Joseph Nelson 1857-1867
 Samuel Mitchell 1867-1903 
 John Reddin 1903–1911

See also

 List of lighthouses in Australia
 List of places on the State Register of Heritage Places in the City of Albany

Gallery

References

External links
 Picture current Point King Lighthouse

Lighthouses completed in 1858
Lighthouses in Western Australia
1858 establishments in Australia
Heritage places in Albany, Western Australia
Disused lighthouses in Australia
State Register of Heritage Places in the City of Albany